Alongside Night is a dystopian novel by science fiction writer J. Neil Schulman intended to articulate the principles of Agorism, a political philosophy created by Samuel Edward Konkin III, to whom Schulman dedicated the work. It was first published during 1979 by Crown Publishers, with subsequent paperback editions released by Ace Books during 1982, Avon Books during 1987, Pulpless.com during 1999, and Amazon Kindle during 2009.

The novel received endorsements from Anthony Burgess and Milton Friedman and was entered into the Libertarian Futurist Society's Prometheus Hall of Fame in 1989. Ross Ulbricht credited the novel and Konkin’s writings as inspirations for the creation of the online marketplace Silk Road.

A film adaptation, written and directed by Schulman, was released in 2014 via Tugg and later on Amazon Prime and home video. It was accompanied by an audiobook version of the novel as well as a graphic novel adaptation of the screenplay.

Plot summary
The story begins with the United States collapsing economically and the government's agents struggling to keep their power after central bankers over-inflated the money supply. Trading in foreign currency is illegal. Businesses are subject to rationing. As a result, there is a growing black market for everything. It's the world as Samuel Edward Konkin III conceived it prior to a successful agorist revolution.

Elliot Vreeland, son of Nobel Laureate Austrian School economist Dr. Martin Vreeland, learns of his father's apparent death, and is rushed home from school. But the death is fake, a plot concocted by his father to escape arrest by the government agents who are detaining "radicals" accused of worsening the economic crisis. Elliot is sent by his father to collect some gold coins stored in case the family has to escape.

Upon his return home, Elliot finds his family missing. Government agents enter the house searching for Elliot, who manages to escape.

Elliot becomes acquainted with the Revolutionary Agorist Cadre, an organization plotting the end of the government agents by means of counter-economics. The cadre is strong and organized, and has its militia. Elliot enlists their help, and meets Lorimer, a girl hiding from the government agents; they develop a relationship.

As the government agents weaken, they tighten controls on communication, travel, and trade. This fails to avert economic collapse, causing the private sector – unions, syndicates, and many unorganized individuals – to control the old infrastructure.

Film adaptation
In 2013, Schulman completed production on a feature-film adaptation of the book, Alongside Night.

References

External links

 Alongside Night – Official Novel Website
 Alongside Night – Novel Page on Facebook

1979 American novels
1979 science fiction novels
Agorism
American novels adapted into films
Anarchist fiction
Dystopian novels
Libertarian science fiction books
Fiction set in 1999
Crown Publishing Group books